Thomas Gerald McAlister (born 10 December 1952) is a Scottish former professional footballer who made more than 350 appearances in the English Football League playing as a goalkeeper.

Career
McAlister is principally remembered for making over 150 league appearances for Rotherham United between 1975–1979, and as West Ham's second choice goalkeeper to Phil Parkes throughout the 1980s. He also appeared for Sheffield United, Blackpool and Swindon and also made loan appearances for Bristol Rovers and Colchester.

Honours

Club
Sheffield United
 Watney Cup Runner-up: 1972–73

Individual
 PFA Team of the Year: 1976–77

References

External links
 
 Tom McAlister at Colchester United Archive Database

1952 births
Living people
Sportspeople from Clydebank
Footballers from West Dunbartonshire
Scottish footballers
Association football goalkeepers
Sheffield United F.C. players
Rotherham United F.C. players
Blackpool F.C. players
Swindon Town F.C. players
Bristol Rovers F.C. players
West Ham United F.C. players
Colchester United F.C. players
English Football League players